This is a list of video games set in London or fictional cities that closely resemble it.

List of games which feature London

List of games which feature a fictional city closely based on London

See also
List of video games set in New York City
List of fiction set in Chicago

References

London

Video games